Kent Olsson (born 1944) is a Swedish politician of the Moderate Party. He has been a member of the Riksdag since 1991.

External links 
Riksdagen: Kent Olsson (m)

Members of the Riksdag from the Moderate Party
Living people
1944 births
Members of the Riksdag 2002–2006

sv:Kent Olsson